Tomáš Jelínek (born April 29, 1962) is a Czech former professional ice hockey winger. He played on the 1992 bronze medal winning Olympic Hockey team for Czechoslovakia.

At club level Jelínek played briefly in the National Hockey League, appearing in 49 games with the Ottawa Senators during the 1992-93 season. In his homeland he featured mainly for HC Sparta Praha, HK Dukla Trenčín, TJ Motor České Budějovice and HC Plzeň and had short spells in Finland, Switzerland and Germany.

His elder son Tomáš Jr played hockey mainly in the domestic lower leagues and in France, and younger son Petr captained HC Bílí Tygři Liberec and was also a Czech international.

Career statistics

Regular season and playoffs

International

References

External links

1962 births
Living people
Calgary Flames scouts
Czech ice hockey right wingers
Czechoslovak ice hockey right wingers
HC Plzeň players
HK Dukla Trenčín players
HC Slavia Praha players
HC Sparta Praha players
Motor České Budějovice players
HC Vítkovice players
HPK players
Ice hockey players at the 1992 Winter Olympics
Medalists at the 1992 Winter Olympics
Olympic bronze medalists for Czechoslovakia
Olympic ice hockey players of Czechoslovakia
Olympic medalists in ice hockey
Ottawa Senators draft picks
Ottawa Senators players
Prince Edward Island Senators players
HC Sierre players
HC Slezan Opava players
Ice hockey people from Prague
1. EV Weiden players
ZSC Lions players
Czechoslovak expatriate sportspeople in Finland
Czechoslovak expatriate ice hockey people
Czech expatriate ice hockey players in Canada
Czech expatriate ice hockey players in Switzerland
Czech expatriate ice hockey players in Germany